Biomot (its badge was only in Greek, the brand spelled "") was a small manufacturer of three-wheeled trucks and other metal products, based in Patras, Greece. Its trucks, produced since 1967, originally used rear-mounted VW air-cooled engines, as well as other VW parts. By 1975 the market for these vehicles had shrunk in Greece, being replaced by four-wheeled imported types. A new “modernized” front-engined model introduced by Biomot failed to save the company.

References 
 L.S. Skartsis, "Encyclopedia of Greek vehicles and aircraft", Achaikes Ekdoseis/Typorama, Patras, Greece (1995) 
 L.S. Skartsis and G.A. Avramidis, "Made in Greece", Typorama, Patras, Greece (2003)  (republished by the University of Patras Science Park, 2007)

External links  
Biomot in Dutch Auto Catalog

Defunct motor vehicle manufacturers of Greece
Three-wheeled motor vehicles
Companies based in Patras